This is a list of North Atlantic Treaty Organization (NATO) installations in Afghanistan used during the War in Afghanistan from 2001–2021. This list encompasses installations used by the International Security Assistance Force from 2001 to 2014 and then by the Resolute Support Mission after 2014. Included are airbases, forward operating bases, main operating bases, combat outposts, firebases, and patrol bases used by NATO forces across the six regional commands (renamed Train Advise Assist Commands after 2014): Regional Command Capital, Regional Command East, Regional Command North, Regional Command South, Regional Command Southwest, and Regional Command West.

History
After 30 September 2013, there were only five sites used by the United Kingdom in Helmand Province including Camp Bastion (the main British base, closed 26 Oct 2014), MOB Price, MOB Lashkar Gah, PB Lashkar Gah Durai and OP Sterga 2 (last base outside Bastion, closed May 2014). After July 2021, all bases outside of Kabul were closed or transferred to the Afghan government. Some military infrastructure remained in Kabul to secure the U.S. embassy, the international zone, and Hamid Karzai International Airport.

Regional Command Capital
Regional Command Capital includes the province of Kabul and is headquartered at Camp KAIA.

Kabul Province

Regional Command East 
Regional Command East includes the provinces of Bamyan, Ghazni, Kapisa, Khost, Kunar, Laghman, Logar, Nangarhar, Nuristan, Paktika, Paktiya, Panjshir, Parwan and Wardak. Bagram Airfield is the home to RC-East command headquarters.

The Provincial Reconstruction Team (New Zealand), responsible for Bamyan Province, had its main base in Bamyan from 2003 onwards.

Kunar or Nuristan Province

Ghazni Province

Kapisa Province

Khost Province

Kunar Province

Laghman Province

Logar Province

Nangarhar Province

Nuristan Province

Paktika Province

Paktia Province

Panjshir Province

Parwan Province

Wardak Province

Regional Command North 
The Regional Command North area of responsibility includes the provinces of Badakhshan, Baghlan, Balkh, Faryab, Jowzjan, Kunduz, Samangan, Sar-e Pul, and Takhar.  The German Bundeswehr commands RC-North and is headquartered in country at Camp Marmal.

Balkh Province

Faryab Province

Kunduz Province

Regional Command South 
Regional Command South includes the provinces of Daykundi, Kandahar, Uruzgan, and Zabul. Kandahar Airfield serves as the headquarters for RC-South, which is commanded by the United States Armed Forces.

Kandahar Province

Uruzgan Province

Zabul Province

Regional Command Southwest 
Regional Command Southwest is headquartered at Camp Leatherneck and includes the provinces of Helmand and Nimruz.

Helmand Province

Nimruz Province

Regional Command West 
Regional Command West includes the provinces of Badghis, Farah, Ghor and Herat.

Badghis Province

Farah Province

Herat Province

Installations of Unknown Regional Province

See also
 List of Afghan Armed Forces installations
 Advance airfield
 Advanced Landing Ground
 Fire support base
 Forward operating base
 Forward Operating Site
 Loss of Strength Gradient
 Main Operating Base

References

Citations

Bibliography

installations